Siran De'Vonte' Neal (born August 4, 1994) is an American football cornerback for the Buffalo Bills of the National Football League (NFL). He played college football at Jacksonville State and was drafted by the Bills in the fifth round of the 2018 NFL Draft.

College career
Neal attended and played college football at Jacksonville State and graduated with a degree in criminal justice. He was a two-time all-Ohio Valley Conference selection in 2016 and 2017, the first year as a linebacker, the second as a safety. In 2016 he made 80 tackles and an interception as a linebacker. Switching to safely in 2017, Neal made 33 tackles and had a team-high 11 pass breakups.

Collegiate statistics

Professional career

Neal was drafted by the Buffalo Bills in the fifth round (154th overall) of the 2018 NFL Draft. He made his NFL debut in the Bills' season opener against the Baltimore Ravens. In Week 4, against the Green Bay Packers, he recorded his first professional sack.

Neal was placed on the reserve/COVID-19 list by the Bills on July 30, 2020, and was activated six days later.

On February 23, 2022, Neal signed a three-year contract extension with the Bills.

References

External links
Buffalo Bills bio
Jacksonville State Gamecocks bio

1994 births
Living people
American football defensive backs
Buffalo Bills players
Jacksonville State Gamecocks football players
People from Abbeville, Alabama
Players of American football from Alabama
LSU Tigers football players